Museum of the Americas may refer to:

 Art Museum of the Americas, an art museum of the Organization of American States (OAS) in Washington, DC
 Dance Art Museum of the Americas, a dance art museum in Santa Fe, New Mexico, USA
 Gilcrease Museum, aka "Gilcrease: The Museum of the Americas", an art and history museum in Tulsa, Oklahoma, USA
 Museo de las Americas, a fine arts museum in Denver, Colorado
 Museo de las Américas, a contemporary art museum in San Juan, Puerto Rico
 Museum of the Americas (Florida), a contemporary art museum in Doral, Florida, USA
 Museum of the Americas (Madrid), a pre-Columbian art history museum (Museo de América) in Madrid, Spain
 Museum of the Americas (Texas), a Native American heritage museum in Weatherford, Texas, USA